The cultural heritage of Morocco (patrimoine national) is protected and promoted in accordance with Law 19-05 (2005) and Law 22-80 (1980), which relate to the nation's  Historic Monuments (monuments historiques), Sites (sites), inscriptions, and objects of art and antiquity. The national heritage register, Inventaire National du Patrimoine Culturel, is maintained by the Institut National des Sciences de l'Archéologie et du Patrimoine (INSAP).

Historic Monuments and Sites
Three hundred historic monuments, sites, and zones have been classed as patrimoine national:

Monuments and buildings
A further ninety-eight monuments and buildings have been inscribed, in Casablanca (49), El Haouz (1), Fes (1), Kenitra (19), Larache (6), Rabat (2), and Tangiers (20).

Museum objects
Thirty-seven archaeological and seventy ethnographic museum objects have been inscribed.

See also
 History of Morocco
 Culture of Morocco

References

External links
  Sites et monuments classés

Moroccan culture
Heritage registers in Morocco